The Traverse City State Hospital of Traverse City, Michigan is a decommissioned psychiatric hospital that has been variously known as the Northern Michigan Asylum and the Traverse City Regional Psychiatric Hospital. It is the last Kirkbride Building of Michigan's original four left in the state. It was listed on the National Register of Historic Places in 1978  and designated a Michigan State Historic Site in 1985.

History

Northern Michigan Asylum was established in 1881 as the demand for a third psychiatric hospital, in addition to those established in Kalamazoo and Pontiac, began to grow. Lumber baron Perry Hannah, "the father of Traverse City," used his political influence to secure its location in his home town. Under the supervision of prominent architect Gordon W. Lloyd, the first building, known as Building 50, was constructed in Victorian-Italianate style according to the Kirkbride Plan. The hospital opened in 1885 with 43 residents.

Under Dr. James Decker Munson, the first superintendent from 1885 to 1924, the institution expanded. Twelve housing cottages and two infirmaries were built between 1887 and 1903 to meet the specific needs of male and female patients. The institution became the city's largest employer and contributed to its growth. In the 1930s three large college-like buildings were constructed near the present site of the Munson Hospital parking deck and the Grand Traverse Pavilions.

Long before the advent of drug therapy in the 1950s, Munson was a firm believer in the "beauty is therapy" philosophy. Patients were treated through kindness, comfort, pleasure, and beautiful flowers provided year-round by the asylum's own greenhouses and the variety of trees Munson planted on the grounds. Restraints, such as the straitjacket, were forbidden. Also, as part of the "work is therapy" philosophy, the asylum provided opportunities for patients to gain a sense of purpose through farming, furniture construction, fruit canning, and other trades that kept the institution fully self-sufficient. The asylum farm began in 1885 with the purchase of some milk cows and within a decade grew to include pigs, chickens, milk and meat cows, and many vegetable fields. In the 1910s-30s, the farm was home to a world champion milk cow, Traverse Colantha Walker. Her grave is at the end of the dirt trail between the farm and the asylum.

While the hospital was established for the care of the mentally ill, its use expanded during outbreaks of tuberculosis, typhoid, diphtheria, influenza, and polio. It also cared for the elderly, served as a rehab for drug addicts, and was used to train nurses. After Munson's retirement, James Decker Munson Hospital was established in his honor on the grounds in 1926, and was operated by the state well after his death and into the 1950s. It was then replaced by Munson Medical Center in the 1950s, the largest hospital in northern Michigan and one of the largest in the state. A portrait of Dr. Munson hangs inside the main lobby of Munson Medical Center. By the time it closed in 1989, pieces of the property had been split between Munson hospital, the Pavilions, Garfield Township and (later) T.M.G.

However, changes in the law and mental health care philosophies brought on the decline of the institution. The farm on the grounds closed in the 1950s, with most of its buildings demolished in the mid-1970s. In 1963, the main 1885 center wing of Building 50 was destroyed because it was deemed a fire hazard and a new modern building was put up in its place. Use of the hospital slowly declined, and it was closed in 1989, with a loss of over 200 jobs to the local economy.

Current status
Over the next decade, the community struggled with plans for reuse of the hospital grounds. In 1993, the property was transferred from the state to the Grand Traverse Commons Redevelopment Corporation. Some of the less historic buildings were demolished. Several redevelopment plans were proposed, but nothing came to fruition until 2000, when the Minervini Group began negotiating with the Grand Traverse Commons Redevelopment Corporation and secured an agreement to renovate the historic buildings. Their efforts have led to the gradual but successful preservation and re-use of the former Building 50 as part of The Village at Grand Traverse Commons, a residential and commercial development. As of 2014 these buildings and cottages are occupied or being close to completion on the Minervini Groups property of the state hospital. Building 50, 56, 58, 60, 61, 63, 67, and 69 are all occupied. Cottages 19, 20, and 36 are all occupied. The farmstead is not part of the Minervini Group; the owners are Garfield Township Parks and Recreation. But the visitor center and botanical garden are all volunteered. Projects that are done turning one of the former granary building into a pavilion, however the basement still exist under the concrete floor. Another building was turned into a visitor center and one of the two cathedral barns has been done. The barn will increase event space in the park. Projects in 2015 include a reflection pool using a former silo foundation and planting more gardens. Another project is turning a partly burnt horse barn into a wall garden using the stone foundation left over.

Description
The Traverse City State Hospital contains multiple buildings located on a large rolling campus. Many of the buildings are constructed from matching buff brick. Building 50, the visual centerpiece of the complex, is a three-story building on a stone foundation containing 386,740 square feet of space. Towers, bracketed eaves, and dormers demonstrate a Victorian ambiance.

Gallery

See also
 Mental hospitals
 Psychiatry
 Kirkbride Plan

References

Further reading

External links

 Minervini webpage
 Kirkbride Buildings —  Information, history, photographs
 Grand Traverse Pavilions — An assisted living center that shares the Grand Traverse Commons and some of the former hospital cottages.
 Historical farmstead  — Historical barns park

Hospital buildings completed in 1885
Traverse City, Michigan
Psychiatric hospitals in Michigan
Defunct hospitals in Michigan
Kirkbride Plan hospitals
Buildings and structures in Grand Traverse County, Michigan
Michigan State Historic Sites
Former psychiatric hospitals
History of mental health in the United States
Historic districts on the National Register of Historic Places in Michigan
National Register of Historic Places in Grand Traverse County, Michigan
Hospital buildings on the National Register of Historic Places in Michigan
1885 establishments in Michigan
Hospitals established in 1881
Hospitals disestablished in 1989
1989 disestablishments in Michigan